Mincing is a food preparation technique in which food ingredients are finely divided into uniform pieces. Minced food is in smaller pieces than diced or chopped foods, and is often prepared with a chef's knife or food processor, or in the case of meat by a specialised meat grinder.

For a true mince, the effect is to create a closely bonded mixture of ingredients and a soft or pasty texture. However, in many recipes, the intention is for firmer foods such as onions and other root vegetables to remain in individual chunks when minced.

Flavoring ingredients such as garlic, ginger, and fresh herbs may be minced in this way to distribute flavor more evenly in a mixture. Additionally, bruising of the tissue can release juices and oils to deliver flavors uniformly in a sauce. Mincemeat tarts/mince pies and pâtés employ mincing in the preparation of mouldable paste. Meat is also minced, and this cooking technique is used in Greek cuisine.

References

External links

Cutting techniques (cooking)
Food preparation techniques
Culinary terminology